Ecological evolutionary developmental biology (eco-evo-devo) is a field of biology combining ecology, developmental biology and evolutionary biology to examine their relationship. The concept is closely tied to multiple biological mechanisms. The effects of eco-evo-devo can be a result of developmental plasticity, the result of symbiotic relationships or epigenetically inherited. The overlap between developmental plasticity and symbioses rooted in evolutionary concepts defines ecological evolutionary developmental biology. Host- microorganisms interactions during development characterize symbiotic relationships, whilst the spectrum of phenotypes rooted in canalization with response to environmental cues highlights plasticity. Developmental plasticity that is controlled by environmental temperature may put certain species at risk as a result of climate change.

Phenotypic plasticity 
Phenotypic or developmental plasticity is the alteration of development through environmental factors. These factors can induce multiple types of variants. An example of discrete variants are the seasonal polyphenisms Bicyclus butterflies. The temperature during the pupa stage determines the phenotype in the adult stage of the butterfly.
A form of meristic variation is the number of segments in Strigamia maritima centipedes. These animals live along the Northern coast of the United Kingdom. The number of leg-bearing segments in these centipedes was lower than in southern populations. Once again, this is a result of differences in temperature. In both these examples, the temperature altered the ontogeny of the organisms.

Epigenetic inheritance 
Epigenetic inheritance is the inheritance of epigenetic marks on the DNA induced by environmental factors. These marks alter gene expression patterns, which can be transmitted to the next generation. This means that environmental cues can influence the development of the organism’s offspring. This is similar to the evolution theory of Lamarck. He stated that an organism can pass physical characteristics that the parent organism acquired through use or disuse during its lifetime on to its offspring. This is not entirely true with epigenetic inheritance, but environmental factors like temperature or food availability during the parent’s life can impact the development of the offspring.

Symbiotic interactions 
Interactions between organisms and symbiotic microbes can influence their evolution and development. Through a shared evolutionary history, certain functions in development may become reliant on a symbiont. Examples of organisms known to have co-evolved in such a way are mammals, nematodes and the Hawaiian bobtail squid.

The light organ of the hawaiian bobtail squid has specialised structures, appendages, to promote colonisation of V. fischeri. These appendages degenerate under the influence of the symbiont. Developmental transcription factors Pax-6, eya and six are downregulated when exposed to V. fischeri. Wolbachia are generally parasitic bacteria that harm their hosts, but are essential for the early development of filarial parasitic nematodes. Wolbachia localises on the posterior side and determines the anterior posterior axis. Mammals are not excluded from such interactions. The development of capillary blood vessels, angiogenesis, in the gut is dependent on the colonisation of symbiotic bacteria. Paneth cells, a cell type of the intestinal epithelia, respond to the presence of these bacteria by secreting molecules that promote angiogenesis.

Climate change 
Climate change may alter the development of organisms. As a type of developmental plasticity, the sex determination of particular animals can be influenced by the temperature of the environment. Some Reptiles and ray-finned fish rely on temperature-dependent sex determination (TSD). The determination takes place during a specific period of the embryonic development. Although the exact mechanisms of this type of sex determination remains unknown for most species, temperature sensitive proteins that determine the sex of alligators have been found. The effects of rising temperatures can already be seen in animals, for example the green sea turtle. Sea turtles produce more females when exposed to higher temperatures. As a result adult green turtle populations are currently 65% female on cooler beaches, but can reach 85% on their warmer nesting beaches. In contrast to the rising female proportion of sea turtles, the fish that use TSD, such as the southern flounder, generally produce more males in response to higher temperatures. Species that are strongly influenced by temperature in their sex determination may be particularly at risk from climate change.

References 

Branches of biology
Ecology
Evolutionary biology
Developmental biology